The Rachidia is an artistic and cultural association specializing in Tunisian music.

The institute's orchestra, ran by Fethi Zghonda, is renowned in Tunisia and other parts of the Maghreb. The association is officially called Association of the Rachidi Institute of Tunisian Music. It is the first musical institution created in Tunisia and one of the oldest ones of Arabic music.

Etymology 

The Rachidia name was chosen in reference to Muhammad I ar-Rashid, third ruler of the Husainid Dynasty. The latter was initiated to music by his mother, an Italian aristocrat. A poet and passionate about music, he played the oud and violin. He was also interested in music, Andalusian songs and worked towards enriching the Tunisian music through Turkish music, particularly in terms of rules and rhythms of nūbāt. This sovereign established a music school at the beylical palace of Le Bardo that was maintained under the rule of his successors.

References

External links 

 

Music organisations based in Tunisia
Education in Tunisia
Educational organisations based in Tunisia
Articles containing video clips